The Dixie Court Hotel was a historic hotel in West Palm Beach, Florida.  It was designed by Harvey & Clarke and was built in 1926.

The hotel was sold in 1943.

On August 21, 1986, it was added to the U.S. National Register of Historic Places.

The building was destroyed  in 1990 for the development of the Palm Beach County Courthouse complex. It was located at 301 North Dixie Highway.

References

External links
 Palm Beach County listings at National Register of Historic Places
 Florida's Office of Cultural and Historical Programs
 Palm Beach County listings
 Dixie Court Hotel

National Register of Historic Places in Palm Beach County, Florida
Demolished hotels in Florida
Buildings and structures demolished in 1990